Jawab  is a 1942 Indian Bollywood film about a love triangle between a man and two women, where the hero, played by Barua, can be no one's lover. The film was directed by P.C Barua. It was the fourth highest grossing Indian film of 1942.

Plot
The plot of movie implies about wealthy, eccentric and self-obsessed Manoj caught in a love triangle between Reba, the feisty, strong-headed, ideological and independent daughter of a meek millionaire Rai bhahadur, and Meena, the soft-spoken, warm-hearted and honest granddaughter of an old Station Master.

Cast
 Pramathesh Barua as Manoj
 Kanan Devi as Meena
 Jamuna as Reba
 Ahindra Choudhury as Raibahadur, Reba's Father
 Jogesh Choudhury as Meena's Grandfather, Station Master
 Ratin Banerjee as Barin, barrister
 Bikram Kapoor	as Nattu, Servant
 Ranjit Ray as Bhiku
 Devabala as Manoj's Mother
 Krishnadhan Mukherjee as Doctor
 Tulsi Chakraborty
 Satya Mukherjee

References

External links
 

1942 films
1940s Hindi-language films
Indian black-and-white films